The Likouala-Mossaka (or Likouala River) is a river in the Republic of the Congo.
It is a tributary of the Congo River, which it enters to the east of the town of Mossaka.

Location

Its basin adjoins that of the Sangha River to the north and the Ogooué River in Gabon to the west.
To the south it adjoins the basin of the Alima, which has hardly any left tributaries.
The lower Sangha, the Likouala-aux-Herbes and Likouala-Mossaka rivers flow through the Congolese Cuvette, a huge depression with an equatorial climate.
The soil of this region is sandy or clayey quaternary fluvial alluvia.
Vegetation is dense, humid, shady forest that partly floods during the high water season.

Hydrology

The basin above this point covered .

European exploration

Pierre Savorgnan de Brazza explored the upper part of the Likouala-Mossaka, the Licona, in August 1878.
Albert Dolisie entered its mouth in 1884.
Giacomo Savorgnan di Brazzà descended the river when he returned from his exploration of the north in December 1885.
In 1899 the whole Likouala-Mossaka basin was granted to the Tréchot brothers who had created the Compagnie Française du Haut-Congo (CFHC) for its operation.
Seventy-two villages had to pay 44,648 francs in taxes.
Until 1909 the French administration of the Likouala-Mossaka basin was very light, and little had been done to develop its resources.

Notes

Sources

Rivers of the Republic of the Congo